Redi Award is an international science award given to scientists who have made significant contributions in toxinology, the scientific study of venoms, poisons and toxins. The award is sponsored by the International Society on Toxinology (ISI).

Origin

Osservazioni intorno alle vipere (Observations about the Viper) written by an Italian polymath Francesco Redi in 1664 is regarded as the milestone in the beginning of toxinology research. Redi was the first scientist to elucidate the scientific basis of snakebite and venom of the viper. He showed for the first time that the viper venom comes from the fang, not the gallbladder as it was believed; that it is not poisonous when swallowed, and effective only when it enters the  bloodstream. He even demonstrated the possibility of slowing down the venom action in the blood by tight ligature before the wound. This work is heralded as the foundation of toxinology. In honour of the pioneer, the International Society on Toxinology (ISI) instituted the Redi Award in 1967 in recognition of scientists for their significant contributions in toxinology research.

Nature of the award

The IST awards scientists or clinicians who have made outstanding contributions to the field of toxinology. The award is given at each World Congress of the Society, which is generally held every three years. It is the highest award bestowed by the society and the most prestigious in the world for toxinologists. Selection for the award is made by the Redi Award Committee chaired by the editor of Toxicon (the official journal of IST) and accompanied by past and present Executive Officers of the society and former Redi awardees. The result is only announced at the World Congress. The recipient is then invited to present a lecture of his/her own choosing, officially called the Redi Lecture, to the congress. The Award consists of a framed citation describing the merits of the awardee and a financial assistance to help cover expenses associated with attendance at the meeting.

Recipients
Source: International Society on Toxinology

 
Findlay E. Russell (USA) 1967
Paul Boquet  (France) 1970
André de Vries (South Africa) 1974
Chen-Yuan Lee (Taiwan) 1976
Hugh Alistair Reid (UK) 1979
Nobuo Tamiya (Japan) 1982
Philip Rosenberg (USA) 1982
Sherman A Minton (USA) 1985
Paul A Christensen (South Africa) 1988
Ernst Habermann (Germany) 1991
Elazar Kochva (Israel) 1994
Evert Karlsson (Sweden) 1997
Alan Harvey (UK) 2000
Andre Menez (France) 2000
Baldomero Olivera (USA) 2003
Lourival Possani (Mexico) 2006
Cesare Montecucco (Italy) 2009
David A Warrell (UK) 2012
Jose Maria Gutierrez Gutierrez (Costa Rica) 2015
 Michel Lazdunski (France) 2017
 Dietrich Mebs (Germany) 2017

See also

 List of biology awards

References

External links
International Society on Toxinology homepage
Alternative IST Homepage

Science and technology awards
Biology awards